Caleb Korteweg is a New Zealand born rugby union player for Glasgow Warriors in the Pro14 and also plays for Netherlands rugby team in the Rugby Europe International Championships. Korteweg was part of the NZ u20 campaign in 2017 but after failing to make the final squad to compete at the 2017 junior World Cup he decided to move to Scotland and play professionally. Korteweg's primary position is scrum-half.

Rugby Union career

Professional career

Korteweg originally moved to Scotland to represent Stirling County in the Super 6 in 2019.

He made his debut for Glasgow Warriors in Round 5 of the 2020–21 Pro14 against Ulster, when he was named as a late replacement on the bench following Jamie Dobie's withdrawal.

International career

He has played 4 times for the Netherlands.

External links
Ultimate Rugby Profile

References

Living people
Dutch rugby union players
Glasgow Warriors players
Rugby union scrum-halves
Stirling County RFC players
1997 births
Netherlands international rugby union players